Korea Pugang Corporation is a North korean parent company founded in 1979.The company contains 9 companies under its corporate structure.The 9 companies are Pugang trading corporation(부강무역회사), Pugang Electronics(부강전자회사),Pugang Hwangchiryong company(부강황치령회사, also known as 부강샘물회사,Company that deals with bottled water from Hwangchiryong area), Pugang pharmaceutical company(부강제약회사),Pugang motorcycle company(부강오토바이회사),Pugang Natural products company(부강천연제품회사),Pugang glass products company(부강유리제품회사 also known as 부강구슬회사) and Korea Pugang Coins Corp(부강주화회사,that makes commemorative coins) and korea pugang mining and machinery corporation ltd(조선부강광산기계회사).The factories of these companies produce metal, machinery, minerals, chemicals, electric lines, construction material,electricity,and food products.

Pugang pharmaceutical company
The Pugang Pharmaceutic Company(富强製藥會社) is a pharmaceutical company founded in 1983 and operated by North Korea's Ministry of Public Health. Although the company did have its assets frozen as a result of U.S. sanctions against North Korea, its products are sold internationally by Lekar Korea, a distributor for the company based in Russia.

Products sold by the company are mostly traditional Korean medicine ("Koryo medicine" in North Korea) supplements combined with high-technology products. These products include Royal Blood-Fresh, and Kumdang-2. Many health claims made by the company have been dismissed as non-scientific outside of North Korea.

Pugang motorcycle company
The company produced the 124cc motorcycle "PugangCM125" in 2005.

Korea Pugang Coins Corp
The Korea Pugang Coins Corp has been minting coins since 1987.In 2013, 20 one-ounce gold coins minted by the company was purchased on an auction by U.S investor Jim Rogers in Singapore.

References

External links
Customs ruling  NY N018392    Oct 23, 2007  RE: The tariff classification and country of origin marking of a dietary supplement from North Korea

Motorcycle manufacturers
Medical and health organizations based in North Korea
Traditional Korean medicine
Drugs
Companies of North Korea